Canang sari is one of the daily offerings made by Balinese Hindus to thank the Sang Hyang Widhi Wasa in praise and prayer. Canang sari will be seen in the Balinese temples (pura), on small shrines in houses, and on the ground or as a part of a larger offering.

Etymology
The phrase canang sari is derived from the Balinese words sari (essence) and canang (a small palm-leaf basket as the tray). Canang itself consists of two syllables from the Kawi language: ca (beautiful) and nang (purpose).

Parts
Canang sari has some parts; there are peporosan, ceper, raka-raka, and sampian urasari. Peporosan or the core material is made from betel leaf, banana leaf, lime, gambier, prestige, tobacco and betel nuts. Material of peporosan symbolizes the Trimurti, the three major Hindu Gods. Shiva is symbolized by lime, Vishnu is symbolized by betel nut, and Brahma is symbolized by gambier. Canang sari are covered by ceper (a tray made from palm leaf) as a symbol of Ardha Candra. Raka-raka is topped with sampian urasari, which are in turn overlaid by flowers placed in a specific direction. Each direction symbolizes a Hindu God (deva):
 White-colored flowers that point to the east as a symbol of Iswara
 Red-colored flowers that point to the south as a symbol of Brahma
 Yellow-colored flowers that point to the west as a symbol of Mahadeva
 Blue or green colored flowers that point to the north as a symbol of Vishnu

A canang sari is completed by placing on top of the canang an amount of kepeng (the coin money) or paper money, which is said to make up the essence (the "sari") of the offering.

Usage
Canang sari is offered every day to Sang Hyang Widhi Wasa as a form of thanking for the peace given to the world; it is the simplest daily household offering.  The philosophy behind the offering is self-sacrifice in that they take time and effort to prepare. Canang sari is not offered when there is a death in the community or family. Canang sari is also used on certain days, such as: Kliwon, Purnama, and Tilem.

Gallery

References

Balinese culture